Manuel G. Posadas (18 October 1841 – 13 March 1897) was an Afro-Argentine musician, journalist and Argentine soldier in the nineteenth century.

Biography
Manuel G. Posadas was born in Buenos Aires, Argentina, on 18 October 1841. He displayed an aptitude for music, and studied under the instruction of Professor Silveira.

He married Emily Smith, of Scottish and Afro-Argentine origin from Buenos Aires, and they had at least three children: Carlos, Manuel and Luis Maria.  The first two children were dedicated to music, a subject in which they excelled, and would go on to study more intensively both in Buenos Aires and around the world.

In 1865 he joined the Argentine Army as a volunteer to fight in the War of the Triple Alliance. He was assigned to the 2nd Battalion of the 3rd. regiment commanded by Colonel José María Morales.  Posadas rose quickly to the rank of sergeant but due to illness, he had to abandon the campaign and return to Buenos Aires.

As a strong supporter of General Bartolomé Mitre, Posadas was appointed captain of National Guards. He participated in the Revolution of 1874 and after the defeat of the liberal party, he continued teaching music and writing in diverse media outlets in the city including El Eco Artistic and La Nación.

He again re-enlisted to the military, being assigned to the Sosa battalion commanded by Colonel Morales. He took an active part in the revolution of 1880 and in the fighting on Monday, June 21st at Puente Alsina and Corrales (the current location of Parque Patricios). He also participated in the 1890 revolution which, despite being defeated, caused the renunciation of President Miguel Juárez Celman.

As a violinist he performed in several theaters in Columbus and Opera. He died in Buenos Aires on March 13 of 1897.

References
Jorge Miguel Ford, Worthy of my race, Typography at the School of Arts and Crafts, 1899
George Reid Andrews, The Afro-Argentines of Buenos Aires, Ediciones de la Flor, 1989
Andrew M. Carter, "transculturation and syncretism in afroporteños", in Tales of the City - A Journal of Buenos Aires, No. 7, December 2000.
Vicente Gesualdo, History of Music in Argentina, Volume 1, Editorial Beta, 1961

1841 births
1897 deaths
Afro-Argentine musicians
Argentine musicians
Argentine journalists